This is a list of countries by external debt, it is the total public and private debt owed to nonresidents repayable in internationally accepted currencies, goods or services, where the public debt is the money or credit owed by any level of government, from central to local, and the private debt the money or credit owed by private households or private corporations based on the country under consideration.

For informational purposes, several non-sovereign entities are also included in this list.

Note that while a country may have a relatively large external debt (either in absolute or per capita terms) it could actually be a "net international creditor" if its external debt is less than the total of  external debt of other countries held by it.

List

See also
 Balance of trade
 Domestic liability dollarization
 List of countries by corporate debt
 List of countries by household debt
 List of countries by public debt
 List of sovereign states by financial assets
 National debt of the United States
 World debt

References

External links
 CIA Factbook - External Debt Definition
 CIA Factbook - External Debt by Countries
 Joint External Debt Hub

Debt
external
Government debt by country
Lists of countries by population-related issue